is a 1990 Japanese film, directed by Haruki Kadokawa and starring Takaaki Enoki, Tsugawa Masahiko, Asano Atsuko, Zaizen Naomi and Nomura Hironobu. The film was released in Japan in June 1990, and an English version was released in North America in 1991.

Ken Watanabe was originally cast in the role of Kenshin but had to pull out due to his severe illness.

Plot

Set in feudal Japan, the daimyō Kagetora (Enoki) must protect his lands and his people from the ambitions of the warlord Takeda (Tsugawa).

Kagetora is also known as Uesugi Kenshin. In the film, Kagetora must defend his province of Echigo against Takeda Shingen. The famous battles include the Battle of Kawanakajima.

Cast
Takaaki Enoki as Uesugi Kenshin
Masahiko Tsugawa as Takeda Shingen
Atsuko Asano as Nami
Naomi Zaizen as Yae
Hironobu Nomura as Takeda "Tarō" Yoshinobu
Taro Ishida as Takeda Nobushige
Binpachi Itō as Kakizaki Kageie
Akira Hamada as Naoe Kagetsuna
Hiroyuki Okita as Kōsaka Danjō
Hideo Murota as Obu Toramasa
Isao Natsuyagi as Yamamoto Kansuke
Tsunehiko Watase as Usami Sadayuki
Morio Kazama 
Masatō Ibu
Kyōko Kishida
Hideji Ōtaki
Tomomichi Nishimura as Narrator

Production
Heaven and Earth was the most expensive Japanese production at the time with a budget of $40 million. The film was shot largely in Canada and was in production for a year and featured 1,000 horses and 3,000 extras.

Reception
In Japan, Heaven and Earth had sold  tickets in pre-sales prior to release. It opened on 23 June 1990 on 215 screens in Japan and grossed $8.4 million, one of the largest openings in Japan at the time. In the United States, the film grossed $307,775.

References

External links

1990 films
1990s historical adventure films
1990s Japanese-language films
Jidaigeki films
Samurai films
Films with screenplays by James Miki
Toei Company films
War epic films
Cultural depictions of Uesugi Kenshin
Cultural depictions of Takeda Shingen
1990s English-language films
1990s Japanese films